Dunstan Thompson (1918–1975) was an American poet who lived in Britain. A Catholic, he wrote openly about gay and wartime experiences.

Life and career

Thompson was born in New London, Connecticut, and educated at Harvard University. He edited a magazine, Vice Versa. in New York City between 1940 and 1942, with Harry Brown.

Thompson joined the U. S. Army in 1942; his Poems (Simon & Schuster) was published in 1943. Borges translated some of his poems into Spanish shortly after. Also in 1942 he published a novel, The Dove with the Bough of Olive. After the war he traveled in the Middle East and settled in the United Kingdom. In 1947, he published Lament for the Sleepwalker, another book of poetry. A travel book, The Phoenix in the Desert, appeared in 1951.

Subsequently, he published little and virtually disappeared from literary circles; a few poems were taken by magazines. Poems 1950-1974 (1984, Paradigm Press) was a posthumous collection.

Raised Catholic, he returned to Catholicism, which led his partner Philip Trower to convert, starting in 1952. After this a priest gave the couple permission to continue living together but as celibates. This arrangement, celibacy but living with a male partner in the 1950s, has been remarked upon by both gay and Catholic critics of his work.

Works
Poems (1943)
"Lament for the Sleepwalkers" (1946)
"Phoenix in the Desert" (1951) Travelogue 
"The Dove with the Bough of Olives" (1954) Novel

References

Further reading

1918 births
1975 deaths
Harvard University alumni
LGBT people from Connecticut
American LGBT poets
LGBT Roman Catholics
American gay writers
American Roman Catholic poets
20th-century American poets
American male poets
20th-century American male writers
20th-century American non-fiction writers
American male non-fiction writers
World War II poets
United States Army personnel of World War II
20th-century American LGBT people
American expatriates in the United Kingdom
Gay poets